Myles Eason (7 May 1915 – 1977) was an Australian actor who performed mostly on stage in England.

He began his career in Melbourne then moved to England in 1937. He appeared on Broadway.

References

External links
 
 

Australian male stage actors
1915 births
1977 deaths